Flight controls may refer to:

Flight control surfaces, the movable surfaces that control the flight of an airplane
Aircraft flight control system, flight control surfaces, the respective cockpit controls, and the systems linking the two
Helicopter flight controls, similar systems for a helicopter
Triangle control frame, the A-frame-like handle used to control hang gliders
Kite control systems
Flight Control (video game), an iPhone game